The Rural Municipality of Paddockwood No. 520 is a rural municipality (RM) in the Canadian province of Saskatchewan within Census Division No. 15 and  Division No. 5.

History 
The RM of Paddockwood No. 520 incorporated as a rural municipality on January 1, 1978.

Geography

Communities and localities 
The following urban municipalities are surrounded by the RM.

Villages
 Paddockwood

Resort villages
 Candle Lake

The following unincorporated communities are within the RM.

Organized hamlets
 Northside

Localities
 Forest Gate
 Foxford
 Glendale Park
 Lakeside Beach
 Minowukaw Beach
 Telwin
 Torch Lake
 Waskateena Beach

Demographics 

Attractions 
Candle Lake

Government 
The RM of Paddockwood No. 520 is governed by an elected municipal council and an appointed administrator that meets on the third Wednesday of every month. The reeve of the RM is Leander (Lance) Fehr while its administrator is Naomi Hrischuk. The RM's office is located in Paddockwood.

Transportation 
 Saskatchewan Highway 2
 Saskatchewan Highway 120
 Saskatchewan Highway 265
 Saskatchewan Highway 791
 Saskatchewan Highway 926
 Saskatchewan Highway 970

See also 
List of rural municipalities in Saskatchewan

References

External links 

P
Division No. 15, Saskatchewan